The streak-necked flycatcher (Mionectes striaticollis) is a species of bird in the family Tyrannidae.

It is found in Bolivia, Colombia, Ecuador, and Peru. Its natural habitats are subtropical or tropical moist montane forests and heavily degraded former forest.

Gallery

References

streak-necked flycatcher
Birds of the Northern Andes
streak-necked flycatcher
Taxonomy articles created by Polbot